Nasser Gemayel (born 6 January 1951, in Ain-Kharroubé, Lebanon) is the first and current eparch of the Maronite Catholic Eparchy of Notre-Dame du Liban de Paris.

Life

Gemayel was born in 1951 at Ain-Kharroubé in Antélias Archeparchy of the Maronites. He attended the seminar at Ghazir and, for some years, the Conservatory of Beirut, while he studied philosophy and theology at the University Institutional Holy Spirit University of Kaslik. He received from the same University and a licentiate in theology and at the Saint Joseph University in the philosophy of Beirut. In 1977 he obtained a masters in philosophy at the Catholic University of Lyon and in 1984 and a doctorate in literature and humanities at the Paris-Sorbonne University in Paris.

He was ordained a priest on 30 August 1981 for the Maronite Catholic Archeparchy of Antelias. He has worked in parishes "Notre Dame du Bon Secours" in Zalka (1984–1985) and "Tues Shaaya" in Brummana (1986–1992). He was then pastor of " Saint Tekla "to Masqua (1992–2000)," Tues Shaaya "in Brummana (2000–2003)," Saint Joseph "in Maamarieh (2003–2004), who worked in the parish of" Saint Jean "on Baouchrié (2004–2005), parish administrator of " Saint Joseph "in Ghabé (2005–2006) and again pastor of" Saint Tekla "Masqua up to the present.

He has taught at several high schools, in some theological colleges and several universities. Gemayel is also the author of books about the Maronite Church.

Gemayel was a member of the Board of Councillors (2003–2004), the Council of Priests of dell'Arcieparchia Antélias (2003–2004), the Central Commission of the Maronite Patriarchal Synod and chaplain in various Catholic schools and Marian confraternities. He has published books on the Maronite Catholic Church. Apart from Arabic, Gemayel speaks French, English, Italian, German and Spanish. He is also an expert in the Syriac language.

His appointment as eparch of the Maronite Catholic Eparchy of Notre-Dame du Liban de Paris was announced on 21 July 2012. Maronite Patriarch of Antioch, Bechara Boutros al-Rahi, OMM, donated to him on 30 August of the same year the episcopal ordination. His co-consecrators were Camille Zaidan, Archbishop of the Maronite Catholic Archeparchy of Antelias, and Samir Mazloum, retired Curial bishop in Antioch. At the same time he was appointed the first Bishop and Apostolic Visitor Eparchial in Western and Northern Europe for the Maronite faithful. He had previously served as pastor of "Saint Tekla" in Masqua, Lebanon.

References

External links
 http://www.maronites.fr/spip.php?article2
 http://www.eglise.catholique.fr/personne/mgr-maroun-nasser-gemayel/

1951 births
Living people
Lebanese Maronites
21st-century Maronite Catholic bishops
Saint Joseph University alumni